The Village Doctor is a 1951 Soviet drama film directed by Sergei Gerasimov.

Plot 
A young doctor Tatyana Kazakova comes in a direction from Moscow to a small district hospital. Initially, the relationship between her and the head   the old doctor Arseny Ivanovich does not add up. But gradually she manages to win the trust of the collective, the sick and gain respect from her senior colleague. Much has to be done together to raise rural health care to a new level.

Cast
 Tamara Makarova as Dr. Tatyana Kazakova
 Grigori Belov as Dr. Arsenyev
 Lena Belsky as Young Mother
 Ivan Bulganov as Sasha
 Anatoly Dudorov as Dr. Anatoly Tyomkin
 Vladimir Gulyaev as Viktor Potapov, steward
 Georgy Millyar as  Dmitry Vasilyevich
 Lev Kapustin as Ivan Pospelov
 Klavdiya Khabarova as Nura, nurse
 Aleksandra Kharitonova as Shura, nurse
 Viktor Klyucharev as Andrey Kulik  
 Ekaterina Savinova as Dusya Pospelova
 Inna Makarova as Baranova
 Rozina Mandelova as Granny
 Nikolay Smorchkov  as Zhenya Strukov	
 Vsevolod Sanaev as Nikolai Petrovich Korotkov
  as Skvortsov
 Valentina Telegina  as Pasha
 Maria Tushova as Head Nurse
 Klara Rumyanova as Lena Zueva

Interesting facts 
During filming, the baby, depicting Lena's baby, fell asleep, and the crying of the newborn was voiced by Klara Rumyanova herself.

References

External links 
 

1951 films
Soviet drama films
1950s Russian-language films
1951 drama films
Films directed by Sergei Gerasimov
Films about physicians
Gorky Film Studio films